Seira may refer to:

 Seira, Estonia, a village in Estonia, Swapnil Padhi
 Seira, Aragon, a municipality in Aragon, Spain
 Seira (springtail), a genus of slender springtails
 SEIRA, surface-enhanced infrared absorption spectroscopy, see List of materials analysis methods#S
 (born 1983), Japanese sabre fencer
 (born 1985),  Chinese–Japanese voice actress
 Seira, a character in the manga series Mermaid Melody Pichi Pichi Pitch
 Seira, a character in the anime series Endro! 

Japanese feminine given names